KZI or variant, may refer to:
 Kozani National Airport (IATA airport code: KZI)
 Kelabit language (ISO 639 code: kzi)
 SAI KZ I, a Danish airplane

See also
 KZ1 (disambiguation)